Kraker or Kräker is a Dutch and German surname. It may originate from Dutch kraken, meaning to make noise, or from German kraken (to whine, to complain). It may also be an occupational name for a hangman, derived from Middle Dutch craghe, meaning neck. The surname may refer to
Francie Kraker Goodridge (born 1947), American track and field athlete and coach
Mehryn Kraker (born 1994), American basketball player 
Steffi Kräker (born 1960), German psychologist and retired gymnast

References

Dutch-language surnames
German-language surnames